Bhiwandi taluka is a taluka in Thane district of Maharashtra in Konkan division.

Thane district
Until 31 July 2014, Thane was the country's most populous district with a population of over 1.2 Million . On 1 August 2014,  the talukas of Mokhada, Jawahar, Talasari, Vikramgadh, Wada, Dahanu, Palghar and Vasai were separated from the erstwhile Thane district to form a new district Palghar. The talukas  Thane, Bhiwandi, Kalyan, Ulhasnagar, Ambernath, Murbad and Shahapur were retained in Thane district.

See also
Base, Maharashtra
Kon

References

Talukas in Thane district
Talukas in Maharashtra